Oscar Herrera Ahuad (born 20 August 1971) is an Argentine physician and politician who is currently governor of Misiones Province, since 10 December 2019. Prior to that, he served as Vice Governor under his predecessor, Hugo Passalacqua. Herrera Ahuad belongs to the Party of Social Concord.

Early life and education
Oscar Herrera Ahuad was born on 20 August 1971 in Quimilí, a small town in Santiago del Estero Province. His parents, Oscar Ramón Herrera and Magdalena Ahuad, were high school teachers. His father was originally from Pampa de los Guanacos, and the family spent some time there after Herrera Ahuad's birth. The family later relocated to Puerto Rico, Misiones. Herrera Ahuad later moved to Corrientes and enrolled at the National University of the Northeast to study medicine.

As a physician, Herrera Ahuad was a resident doctor at the Samic Hospital in Eldorado and at the San Pedro Hospital, of which he was later director. He also served as director of the Zona Noreste medical district.

Political career
Herrera Ahuad's political involvement began, according to him, due to his uncle, who was a candidate to intendente (mayor) of Puerto Rico in several occasions. Herrera Ahuad's was also a mayoral candidate in 2007, though he lost the election. In 2009 he was appointed Undersecretary of Health of the province, in the administration of Maurice Closs. In 2011 he was appointed Minister of Health of the province.

In 2015, Herrera Ahuad ran in the Front for the Renewal of Concord ticket as vice governor candidate alongside Hugo Passalacqua; the ticket won the election and Herrera Ahuad was sworn in as Vice Governor on 10 December 2015.

He ran for the governorship in 2019 and won the election with 72.81% of the vote.

Personal life
Herrera Ahuad is married to Graciela Traid, with whom he has two daughters: Giuliana and Agustina. He is a fan of Club Atlético San Lorenzo.

References

External links

1971 births
Living people
People from Quimilí
Argentine physicians
Governors of Misiones Province
Vice Governors of Misiones Province
National University of the Northeast alumni
21st-century Argentine politicians